Studies in Mycology is a peer-reviewed open access scientific journal of mycology published by Elsevier on behalf of the Royal Netherlands Academy of Arts and Sciences' CBS Fungal Biodiversity Centre. The journal was established in 1972, and is edited by Robert A. Samson. It is published three times per year.

Indexing and abstracting
According to the Journal Citation Reports, Studies in Mycology has a 2014 impact factor of 13.250. It is abstracted and indexed in the following bibliographic databases:
BIOSIS Previews
Science Citation Index
Scopus

References

External links

Studies in Mycology @ Royal Netherlands Academy of Arts and Sciences' CBS Fungal Biodiversity Centre

Mycology journals
Publications established in 1972
Elsevier academic journals
Open access journals
Triannual journals
English-language journals